The R. S. Smith Motor Company Building is a historic building in Sandy, Oregon, United States, built in 1930. It is listed on the National Register of Historic Places.

History
The building was named for Robert S. Smith (18861966), a native of Clay Center, Kansas who settled in nearby Boring, Oregon, before relocating to Sandy between 1909 and 1911. In Sandy, Smith established the Sandy Blacksmith and Horseshoeing Shop, which he operated with his brother, Melvin. 

The R. S. Smith Motor Building was constructed after Smith shifted from blacksmithing and entered the automobile sales business, opening a Ford Motor Company agency in 1912. The building was fashioned as an auto sales showroom and garage with a combined service station. Designed in the Mission Revival architectural style, the building, constructed in 1930, is primarily made of concrete. At the time of the building's construction, Smith was the mayor of Sandy. In addition to Ford vehicles, Smith would later sell Studebaker models in the 1960s. It was placed on the National Register of Historic Places in 1994.

See also
National Register of Historic Places listings in Clackamas County, Oregon

References

Works cited

External links

1930 establishments in Oregon
Buildings and structures in Clackamas County, Oregon
Buildings and structures completed in 1930
Commercial buildings on the National Register of Historic Places in Oregon
Mission Revival architecture in Oregon
National Register of Historic Places in Clackamas County, Oregon
Transportation buildings and structures on the National Register of Historic Places in Oregon
Sandy, Oregon